Edward Sellers may refer to:

 Edward A. Sellers (died 1985), founding director of the Banting and Best Diabetes Centre
 Edward Breathitte Sellers (died 1883), first known college graduate of color of Wheaton College